Gennady Petrovich Bessonov (born 10 December 1944) is a retired Russian triple jumper. He competed at the 1972 Summer Olympics and placed 15th.

References

1944 births
Living people
Athletes (track and field) at the 1972 Summer Olympics
Olympic athletes of the Soviet Union
Russian male triple jumpers
Soviet male triple jumpers
Sportspeople from Moscow Oblast